Piedraia is a genus of fungus.

Piedraia hortae is responsible for black piedra.

References

Dothideomycetes genera
Animal fungal diseases
Capnodiales